Jonjo Farrell (born 28 September 1988) is an Irish hurler who played as a full-forward for the Kilkenny senior team.

Born in Thomastown, County Kilkenny, Farrell first played competitive hurling during his schooling at St. Kieran's College. He arrived on the inter-county scene at the age of seventeen when he first linked up with the Kilkenny minor team before later joining the under-21 and intermediate sides. He made his senior debut during the 2014 National Hurling League. Farrell has since gone on to join Kilkenny's championship panel.

At club level Farrell is a one-time All-Ireland medallist with Thomastown in the junior grade. In addition to this he has also won one Leinster medal and two championship medals in the junior grade.

Personal life
Farrell works as a teacher in St. Kieran’s College

Career statistics

Honours

Team

St. Kieran's College
All-Ireland Colleges Senior Hurling Championship (1): 2004 (sub)
Leinster Colleges Senior Hurling Championship (2): 2004 (sub), 2005

Thomastown
All-Ireland Junior Club Hurling Championship (1): 2013 (c)
Leinster Junior Club Hurling Championship (1): 2012 (c)
Kilkenny Junior Hurling Championship (2): 2005, 2012 (c)

Limerick Hurling Club
Chicago Senior Hurling Championship (1): 2010

Kilkenny
All-Ireland Senior Hurling Championship (2): 2014 (sub), 2015 (sub)
Leinster Senior Hurling Championship (2): 2014 (sub), 2016
National Hurling League (1): 2014 (sub)
Leinster Intermediate Hurling Championship (3): 2008 (sub), 2009, 2011
All-Ireland Under-21 Hurling Championship (1): 2008
Leinster Under-21 Hurling Championship (2): 2008, 2009
Leinster Minor Hurling Championship (1): 2006

References

1988 births
Living people
Thomastown hurlers
Kilkenny inter-county hurlers